Ghajini is a 2008 Indian Hindi-language action thriller film written and directed by A. R. Murugadoss, jointly produced by Allu Aravind, Tagore Madhu and Madhu Mantena. A remake of Murugadoss's own 2005 Tamil film of the same name which itself is inspired by the 2000 film Memento, the film stars Aamir Khan, with Asin Thottumkal reprising her role from the original in her Hindi film debut, Pradeep Rawat also reprising his role as the titular antagonist, and Jiah Khan in pivotal roles. The score and soundtrack were composed by A. R. Rahman, while Aamir co-wrote an altered climax. Murugadoss had written half of the film's story when he watched Memento, and claimed to merely use the character due to his short-term memory loss condition. In the film, a businessman suffering from anterograde amnesia sets out to avenge his girlfriend with the aid of photographs from a Polaroid Instant camera and permanent tattoos on his body.

Released theatrically on 25 December 2008, Ghajini became the highest-grossing Indian film of the year, and the first Bollywood film to cross the 100 crore mark domestically, creating the 100 Crore Club. Ghajini'''s paid preview collections were  2.7crore. It went on to become the highest-grossing Indian film of all time, until it was surpassed by Aamir's next, 3 Idiots (2009), the following year and then by Shah Rukh Khan's Chennai Express (2013). Aamir's character was featured in a 3D video game titled Ghajini – The Game, which is based on the film.

Plot
Sunita, a medical student, is investigating the anterograde amnesia case of Sanjay Singhania, the chairman of Air Voice, a telecommunications company. She does so against her professor Dr. Debkumar Mitra's wishes, in spite of Sanjay being under criminal investigation. Sanjay, who loses his memory every 15 minutes, uses a system of photographs, notes, and tattoos on his body to recover his memory and remember his mission of avenging the murder of his fiancé Kalpana Shetty, who was killed by a criminal kingpin, Ghajini Dharmatma.

Police officer Arjun Yadav, who is investigating a murder that Sanjay committed knocks Sanjay unconscious in a scuffle at his apartment and finds two diaries in his drawer. He learns that Sanjay who is a successful entrepreneur met Kalpana, a struggling model, after he planned on installing an advertising billboard above her apartment. When his agents arrive at Kalpana's shooting site to negotiate with her about it, Kalpana's boss, advertising veteran Satveer Kohli, misinterprets this as a romantic advance and, in a view of fame and fortune, encourages Kalpana to accept the overture. Kalpana also decides to pose as Sanjay's girlfriend. As soon as Sanjay finds out about the false rumor, he plans to meet Kalpana to confront her but fails, as he starts to like her after seeing her altruistic nature. He poses as Sachin Chauhan, a newcomer model, and lies to Kalpana about himself. Soon, he falls deeper in love with her. At the end of the first diary, on 31 December, Sanjay, still playing Sachin, proposes to Kalpana who, taken aback by such a sudden gesture, asks for the night to think over it. He decides that if she would agree, then he would reveal his true identity to her, but, if not, then he would quietly walk away from her life as Sachin.

As Arjun starts reading the second diary, Sanjay attacks him and ties him up. Sunita locates the apartment, finds Arjun and learns of Sanjay's murder plot. She steals his diaries and frees Arjun. As she and Arjun escape, Arjun is hit by a bus. Sunita then informs Ghajini about the fact that Sanjay is coming to him to kill him. Sanjay finds out about this and goes to attack her at her dormitory, where he is arrested and given a sedative. Ghajini is informed by the police about Sanjay's belongings and he poses as Sanjay's friend. Soon Sanjay's employees and doctor arrive and take him home. There, Ghajini and his men destroy his pictures and cover his tattoos, thus leaving him with no memory of the past.

After Sanjay gets arrested, Sunita reads the diaries. She finds out about Kalpana. In the second diary, Kalpana accepts the proposal, but on the condition that she marry only after she purchases three ambassador cars, due to a past commitment. One thing leads to another and Sanjay decides on telling her the truth about himself later. The diary ends abruptly when Sanjay has to go overseas for a few days.

After some research, Sunita eventually learns Kalpana travelled to Goa, where she stumbled across and freed a group of girls from a sex trafficking ring racketeered by Ghajini. Sanjay returns home and finds Kalpana stabbed. Ghajini hits Sanjay in the head with an iron rod which results in brain injury, before killing Kalpana with the same rod, in front of him. Feeling guilty of doubting him, Sunita reminds Sanjay of Kalpana's murder and helps him track Ghajini to his local area. Sanjay then kills his men but has a memory loss fit while searching for Ghajini, who takes advantage of the situation and stabs Sanjay. As he prepares to kill Sunita the same way he killed Kalpana, Sanjay recovers his memory and kills Ghajini with the iron rod.

Six months later, Sanjay returns as the chairman of Air Voice and is volunteering at an orphanage named after Kalpana, helping everyone like she did, and trying to heal. Sunita gifts him the cement pad with Sanjay and Kalpana's foot impressions and he feels Kalpana beside him, as the screen pans out in a fading sunset.

Cast
Aamir Khan as Sanjay Singhania / Sachin Chauhan, a rich businessman; the chairman of a telecommunications company, Air Voice; who later suffers from short-term memory loss after a tragic incident caused by Ghajini, being solely motivated, thus, to kill him and his cohorts
Asin as Kalpana Shetty, a model who gains publicity by falsely proclaiming herself to be the girlfriend of Sanjay Singhania, but soon becomes his love interest, later getting killed by Ghajini
Jiah Khan as Sunita Kalantri, a medical student, who tries to study the case of Sanjay Singhania and his amnesiac problem, even though she is forbidden to do so
Pradeep Rawat as Ghajini Dharmatma, a gang honcho and the mastermind of many illegal and criminal ventures who is targeted by Sanjay
Riyaz Khan as Inspector Arjun Yadav, a police inspector who is investigating the murders Sanjay committed
Rajesh Khattar as Arjun's voice
Khalid Siddiqui as Pankaj Shroff, Sanjay's private assistant and an Air Voice manager
Tinnu Anand as Satveer Kohli, Kalpana's boss
Sai Tamhankar as Amrita Kashyap, Sunita's friend
Supreeth Reddy as Ghajini's henchman
Vibha Chibber as Havaldar Vaijayanti
Sunil Grover as Sampat, a model who is being trained as the fake Sanjay Singhania
Rajendran as Ghajini's henchman
Firdausi Jussawalla as Dr. Peston Wadia
Sonal Sehgal as ad model
Anjum Rajabali in a cameo appearance as Dr. Debkumar Mitra, Sunita's professor

Production
It was rumoured earlier that the film was titled Kajri. It is a remake of the Tamil film, Ghajini (2005). Aamir Khan, who had never before worked in a remake film in his career, was initially hesitant to do the film, but was convinced by Suriya, the original star of the Tamil Ghajini, who told him he was "the only one who could do justice to the character." Suriya was a fan of Khan, and had some involvement in the film's development, discussing minute details with Khan for two years during the film's development. Priyanka Chopra was offered a lead role in the film, but Khan preferred Asin Thottumkal over her as he loved her performance in the original film.

Khan was involved in the film's creative writing process, deciding what should remain from the original Tamil Ghajini and what changes should be made. Murugadoss revealed that the altered climax of the film was rewritten by Khan. According to Murugadoss:

Influences
Murdagoss's original 2005 Tamil version of Ghajini was inspired by the American film Memento (2000), which itself was adapted from the short story Memento Mori. The film stars Guy Pearce as Leonard Shelby, a former insurance fraud investigator searching for the man he believes raped and killed his wife during a burglary. Leonard suffers from anterograde amnesia, which he contracted from severe head trauma during the attack on his wife. Certain concepts like writing notes behind instant Polaroid photographs and tattooing facts on his body are also similar. According to Khan, "Ghajini is not a remake or even slightly inspired by Memento, but rather a remake of the Tamil film, Ghajini". However, he acknowledged that Murgadoss's original Tamil film was at least partly inspired by Memento, stating, "Murgadoss had heard about a film called Memento and the concept had really fascinated him. Without having seen the film he went ahead and wrote his own version of the script and screenplay. Having finished his script, he then saw Memento, found it very different from what he had written, and went ahead and made Ghajini."

The CGI opening brain sequence was inspired by the 1999 film Fight Club by David Fincher. This sequence was also used in the Tamil version of the film.

The film's title is a reference to Mahmud of Ghazni, the tenth-century Sultan of Ghaznavid Empire whose name is pronounced "Ghajini" in Tamil. Several comical scenes in the film are similar to Happy Go Lovely (1951). The scene where Kalpana (Asin Thottumkal) helps a blind man to cross the road is similar to the French film Amélie.

Filming
Shooting started in Chennai in May 2007. Climax was shot in Old City, Hyderabad. Other filming locations included Bangalore, Cape Town in South Africa, the Deadpan Desert in Namibia and Mumbai. Aamir Khan had spent a year working out at the gym, training for his role. This film marked the Bollywood debut for Asin.

ReleaseGhajini was released on 25 December 2008 with an estimated 1,500 prints worldwide, including 1,200 prints (digital and analogue versions) in the domestic market, making it the largest Bollywood release at that time.

The overseas distributors, Reliance Entertainment released the film with 300 prints in 22 countries, including 112 prints in the US and Canada, 65 prints in the UK and 36 prints in the UAE. Ghajini was also released in Norway, Germany, Denmark, Netherlands, Belgium, South Africa, Australia, New Zealand, Hong Kong and Singapore.

Home media
The two-disc collector's edition DVD was manufactured by Big Home Video and distributed by international distributor, Adlabs Films Ltd (New name is Reliance MediaWorks) on 13 March 2009.

Video game

A PC video game based on the film was manufactured and produced by FXLabs Studios Pvt Ltd and Geetha Arts, and marketed and distributed by Eros Home Entertainment: Ghajini – The Game. It is a third-person action game consisting of five levels of play; here the player controlled the protagonist Sanjay to accomplish missions using martial arts, weapons, and artefacts. It was hailed as India's first true 3D PC game with an MSRP of US$14.99. Although never officially rated, the distributor recommends that 15+ year old players partake in the game.

Controversy

Director A. R. Murugadoss was arrested shortly before the film's completion. According to Salem Chandrasekhar, the producer of the Tamil original, he had not bought the rights to remake the film in Hindi.

Reception
50% of the reviews in review aggregator Rotten Tomatoes were positive.

Critical response
Rajeev Masand of CNN IBN gave 3 stars writing, "Ghajini isn't a particularly good film, but entertainment it delivers by the bucketful." Martin D'Souza of Bollywood Trade News Network gave 3.5 stars, noting the flaws in screenplay, while praising the action. Taran Adarsh of Bollywood Hungama remarked that the movie "is a winner all the way" and gave it 4.5 stars. Nikhat Kazmi of The Times of India praised the performance by Aamir Khan as its high point and awarded 3.5 stars.Zee News described Aamir's performance as his best to date. Sukanya Verma of Rediff gave the movie 3.5 stars, while describing the film as "a sleek album of dark memories, which are terrifying to relive and shattering to experience". Noyon Jyoti Parasara of AOL India said, "Most comparisons often point out that a remake is not as worthy.Ghajini however succeeds when it is compared to the Tamil version directed by the same director." Anupama Chopra of NDTV said "Ghajini isn't a great film or even a very good one but I recommend that you see it. It is, as we used to say in the old days, paisa vasool. Kaveree Bamzai of India Today said that "This is brutality, choreographed by a poet, and therefore that much more compelling." giving it 3.5 stars.

The film received some mixed and negative reviews. Gaurav Malani of Indiatimes gave 2 stars, criticising its length while praising the performance of the cast. Raja Sen of Rediff rated the movie 2.5/5 and criticised the performance of Asin while concluding, "overwhelming feeling is one of regret". Shubhra Gupta of Express India concluded that Ghajini is too long, too violent, and criticised Jiah Khan's acting and dancing skills, but praised the performances of Aamir Khan and Asin. Hindustan Times gave it 2 stars and said "You'd like to give Ghajini a long-term memory loss. Kya, kyon, kahan? Murugadoss.? Aamir? Asin? Who? Got to jog my memory... maybe after 15 minutes."

Box officeGhajini released worldwide on 25 December 2008, on Christmas Day. The film became the first-ever Bollywood film to open in double digits, collecting ₹102 million ($1.27 million) on its opening day, followed by ₹118 million ($1.47 million), ₹102.5 million ($1.28 million) and ₹87.5 million ($1.09 million), taking its four-day opening weekend collection to ₹410 million ($5.13 million). The film went past ₹1 billion ($12.5 million) domestically in its fourth week, thus becoming the first ever Bollywood film to cross ₹100 crore domestically. It was the first Bollywood film to enter the 100 crore club.Ghajini became the highest-grossing Indian film ever at the time, and was declared an "All Time Blockbuster". Its record was eventually surpassed a year later by another Aamir Khan film, 3 Idiots (2009).

Soundtrack

The film has six songs, including two remixes, composed by A. R. Rahman and with lyrics penned by Prasoon Joshi.

ReceptionBollywood Hungama wrote, "The music of Ghajini is all set to make waves way into 2009 after the Christmas release of the film. When 'best of the best' list would be compiled at the year end, it would be hard to ignore Ghajini."Rediff.com'' gave it the highest possible rating of five stars with the reviewer praising Rahman saying, "This could just be one of his finest albums ever. Not just are the tracks great, but each one segues into the next with perfect unpredictability." According to the Indian trade website Box Office India, the soundtrack album sold about 1.9million units, making it the year's best selling Bollywood music soundtrack album.

Awards and nominations

See also
Short-term memory loss
Declarative memory

Notes

References

External links 
 Film Review on Devildead 
 
 
 
 

2008 films
2000s Hindi-language films
2008 action thriller films
Indian action thriller films
Films about amnesia
Films about tattooing
Hindi remakes of Tamil films
Films shot in Namibia
Films directed by AR Murugadoss
Films scored by A. R. Rahman
Reliance Entertainment films
Geetha Arts films
Indian remakes of American films
Films shot in Bangalore
Films set in Mumbai
Films shot in Mumbai
Films shot in Chennai
Indian films about revenge
Films shot in South Africa
Indian nonlinear narrative films